Liam Henry (born 24 July 2001) is an Australian professional rugby league footballer who plays as a  for the Penrith Panthers in the NRL (National Rugby League).

In round 25 of the 2022 NRL season, Henry made his debut for the Panthers against the North Queensland Cowboys.

References

External links
Penrith Panthers profile

2001 births
Living people
Australian rugby league players
Penrith Panthers players
Rugby league props
Rugby league players from Orange, New South Wales